Charley Ridge is a ridge in West Virginia, in the United States.

Charley Ridge derives its name from Charles Kennison, a local pioneer.

References

Ridges of Pocahontas County, West Virginia
Ridges of West Virginia